Rose Tan (born 4 September) is the pen name of a Filipino writer who mostly creates romance and thriller Tagalog pocketbook novels. Her most notable work is The Bud Brother Series that has been televised by ABS-CBN under the same series name.

Personal life

Tan was born on September 4 and was a graduate of Mass Communication in the Far Eastern University (FEU). She is a single mother to a son and she stated in an interview with the morning show Pambansang Almusal that she would not want her child to read her novels, as some scenarios may not be suitable for children.

Career
In the same interview with Pambansang Almusal, she admitted that she lost track of how many novels she has created. Her most popular creation is The Bud Brothers Series when it was adapted into a television series.

Bibliography

Balawis

Best Men Don't Wed Society

Blush

Bud Brothers

Bud Brothers Group

Bud Brothers Series

Bud Brothers Unlimited Series

Cinderella

Engkanto

Frenemies

Fruitcakes

Hot Intruder

Huddunit

Impakta

IOU Series

Jewels

Last Trip

Maty Go Mystery

Mga Apo ni Rustica

Modern Girl

My Love, My Hero

My Lovely Bride

PHR Classics

Rebel Fiction

Secrets

Señorita

Señorito

Somewhere in my Heart (Tales of the Traveling Bling)

Standalone Novels

Thin Version

Thick Version

Sylvia Roces Love Files

Txtlyf

Wedding Bells and Magic Spells

Writer's Block

References
 https://www.rappler.com/entertainment/34612-pulp-fiction-pop-lit
 https://entertainment.abs-cbn.com/tv/updates/18042218-throwback-precious-hearts-romances-presents-bud-brothers-2009
 https://youngstar.ph/unmistakable-charm-of-precious-hearts-romances/
 https://lifestyle.inquirer.net/186385/precious-pages-corp-launches-25-most-precious-coffee-table-book/
 https://www.gmanetwork.com/news/lifestyle/content/448749/forever-yours-the-enduring-appeal-of-the-pinoy-romance-novel/story/
 http://phr.com.ph/rose-tan/
 https://therosetancollections.wordpress.com/

Filipino writers
Living people
Year of birth missing (living people)